John Francis Greif (23 September 1897–17 August 1968), was an Austrian-born Roman Catholic priest who served as Bishop of the Diocese of Tororo, in Uganda, from 25 March 1953 until 17 August 1968.

Background and priesthood
Grief born on 23 September 1897, in the town of Mölten in Austria-Hungary, which is nowadays in northern Italy. He was ordained priest on 16 July 1922, taking the vows of the Saint Joseph's Missionary Society of Mill Hill (Mill Hill Fathers). He served in that capacity until 10 May 1951.

As bishop
He was appointed bishop on 10 May 1951 by Pope Pius XII and was consecrated as Vicar Apostolic of Tororo, Uganda and Titular Bishop of Belabitene on 25 July 1951, by Archbishop David James Mathew†, Titular Archbishop of Apamea in Bithynia, assisted by Bishop John Reesinck†, Titular Bishop of Thinis, and Bishop Vincent Billington†, Titular Bishop of Avissa.

On 25 March 1953, when the Vicariate Apostolic of Tororo was elevated to the Diocese of Tororo, Bishop John Francis Grief was appointed the new Bishop of the Diocese of Tororo, that same day. On 17 August 1968, he died in office, as Bishop of Tororo, at the age of 70 years and 11 months.

See also
 Catholic Church in Uganda
 Mill Hill Fathers

Succession table at Tororo

References

External links
 Profile of the Roman Catholic Archdiocese of Tororo

1897 births
1968 deaths
20th-century Roman Catholic bishops in Uganda
18th-century Austrian Roman Catholic priests
People from Mölten
Roman Catholic archbishops of Tororo